Project Morrinho (in Portuguese "Projeto Morrinho") is a social and cultural project based out of the Favelas Cariocas and the Favela (Pereirão) in the Laranjeiras neighborhood of Rio de Janeiro, Brazil.  Morrinho, which was started by local youth in 1997, is a 450m² model of the city constructed from bricks and other recycled materials. It began as a simple childhood game to escape from the realities of violence and corruption that surrounded the teens and their community.

Within this miniature urban world of Morrinho ("little hill"), participants act out a role-playing game with the numerous people made from Lego that inhabit the model, recreating life in Rio's favelas. Morrinho reproduces the favelas of Rio de Janeiro as an intricate and multifaceted model.  In addition to the Lego people, Morrinho includes cars, police vehicles, and a helicopter, representing the reality lived by these young people.  Throughout the years, Morrinho has garnered increasing attention for its aesthetics and ingenuity of its child creators, growing from a local phenomenon to a popular international exhibit.  It has been able to use that attention to evolve, not only as a work of art, but also, into an organization with aspirations for social change. Currently, more than 20 teenagers are following in the example of Morrinho's founding members.

History

Project Morrinho was created in 1997 by Cirlan Souza de Oliveira, a 14-year-old boy who had recently moved to Rio de Janeiro.  Oliveira was impressed with the architecture and style of life in the city's favelas and he decided to playfully reproduce this reality in his own backyard with bricks and paint left over from his father's work in construction. This diversion caught the attention of seven other local youths, and what was begun as a game became a hobby.

In 2001, on a visit to the community, film directors Fábio Gavião, Marco Oliveira, and Francisco Franca invited the boys to participate in their work of image captivation.  This partnership became a non-governmental organisation composed of four components: tourism at Morrinho, TV Morrinho, Expo Morrinho and Morrinho Social. In 2008, after seven years chronicling the history of Morrinho and the lives of its creators, filmmakers Fábio Gavião and Markão Oliveira released a full-length documentary titled Morrinho: God Knows Everything But Is No Snitch.

The unique character and innovation of the Morrinho model has been recognized by curators and critics as a legitimate expression of contemporary art, and has drawn considerable international attention from journalists, architects, musicians, scholars, and tourists.  Smaller scale replicas of the Morrinho model have been exhibited throughout Brazil and Europe, including the 2004 Urban World Forum in Barcelona, the 2005 Point Ephémère in Paris and the 2007 Venice Biennale. In Venice, on the occasion of the Biennale Visual Art Exhibition, the project was selected by the Director, Robert Storr, and Morrinho Project was also performed, in a radio-dramatic version, for a promotional radio format in collaboration with Radio Sherwood (Marghera, Venice), called Radio Morrinho (with interviews and live interventions).

Components
Morrinho has four components: Tourism at Morrinho, TV Morrinho, Expo Morrinho, and Morrinho Social.  Each is important to shaping the project as a whole.

Morrinho Tourism
Morrinho is open to the public and encourages travelers and locals to visit the project.  This facilitates an exchange of ideas and allows a better understanding of the project and its meaning to the community.

Television Morrinho
TV Morrinho serves as a center for original independent and contracted video productions that derive from the model.  TV Morrinho is a performance-based exhibition that began after the success of the 2007 Venice Biennal.  The work debuted at the Wiener Festwochen (Vienna International Theater Festival) in 2008, and recently won a grant from the Ministry of Culture of Brazil.  With TV Morrinho Live, the group builds a miniature favela, a replica of the Rio original.  For the performances, they develop a scripted role-playing drama involving the LEGO-figurine 'inhabitants' of the favela.  The story is then played out and projected live via three video cameras onto a large screen for the audience to follow.  The exhibition also features a music performance by MC Maiquinho, one of the Morrinho youth who has become a renowned funk singer.

In addition to productions created specifically for exhibitions around the world, TV Morrinho has produced numerous independent videos based on stories that have been developed in Morrinho.

TV Morrinho has also been contracted by clients such as British Gas Brazil, Casa França-Brasil, the Brazilian Ministry of Health, BHP Billiton, Junior Achievement and Nickelodeon Brazil.

TV Morrinho has also won the prize for Best Video at Visions of the Periphery Audiovisual Festival.

Morrinho Exhibition
Project Morrinho has been recognized domestically, as well as internationally at various exhibitions and festivals.  At these events, a small scale model was built by the members of Morrinho to display to spectators.  The following is a list of exhibitions:

 (March 2017. In process) !!!!
Traveling exhibitions 3 states of Brazil
(São Paulo: from 10 to 22 March)
(Brasilia: 03/03 to 04/04)
(Manaus: from 04/13 to 04/26)
(Partners): Itaú Cultural / Rumos / Producer Numen @MorrinhoProject
Artistic Name of the Process: Micror Residências Project Morrinho 2017

post_facebook.jpg

Morrinho Social
Morrinho Social, the fourth component, was still being developed as of August 2009.  Following the slogan "Initiating a Small Revolution", Morrinho Social intends to offer profession qualification workshops to the residents of the Pereirão community.  The idea has been developed over the past two years and aims to odder an education al component that complements the overarching values of Morrinho of social justice and economic mobility.

Through informal means Morrinho Social will develop the area of education and professionalism under the following courses:
Audiovisual
Art Education
Youth Leadership
Youth and Citizenship

Goals

Morrinho aims to bring positive change to the local community, as well as challenge the popular perception of Brazil's favelas.  Through its work, Morrinho contributes directly to the socio-cultural and economic development of the surrounding areas.  The belief that favelas are merely dominated by drug trafficking and violence is not all encompassing.  Morrinho communicates the realities of life through film, plastic arts, theater and music and shows that life in the favela is multi-dimensional.

External links
Official Morrinho Website (in Portuguese and English)
Project Morrinho Facebook Page
Project Morrinho YouTube Channel
TV Morrinho YouTube Channel
Morrinho Tourism Blog

References

Favelas